Rebekka Wolf (née, Heinemann) was a German-Jewish cookbook author. In 1851, she published Kochbuch für israelitische Frauen (cookbook for Jewish women).  It was continuously revised and expanded through 14 editions. The last known edition was published in Frankfurt in 1933.

Notes

External links
 

19th-century German women writers
Cookbook writers
German women non-fiction writers
Jewish German writers
Women cookbook writers
Jewish women writers
Year of birth unknown
Year of death unknown